The Techirghiol TV Tower is a 146-meter high TV tower built of reinforced concrete at Techirghiol, Romania.

Notes

See also 
 List of towers

External links 
 Pictures and description in Romanian
 

Towers in Romania
Transmitter sites in Romania